|arcade system=Millennium 95085 Microsystem Emulator
}}

 is a vertically scrolling shooter first released as an arcade video game by Data East in 1984. A version was released in 1986 for the Family Computer. It was Data East's very first home release for the console.

Gameplay
The game consists of 45 levels (30 in the Famicom version), and no background story or plot is given. The player controls a robotic aircraft called the FX-1, and collects weapon power-up parts (called a "wing") to progress through the levels and ultimately destroy enemy bosses called "Gobunasu" at every end of the level. The game consists of two different top-view screen levels, where the player can press the second button to descend to the ground whenever they do not have a power-up. The player is unaffected by attacks from airborne units while they are playing on the ground level, but the ship is automatically brought back into the air after a certain period of time. The player can still be hit by attacks from ground units while they are on the ground level, and can also lose their ship by crashing into obstacles. The 8-way joystick controls the player's movements, and one button is used for shooting, and the other is used for descending to the ground (or un-equipping wings). The background image continues infinitely when the player scrolls in the horizontal directions.

The game was remade to the Famicom in 1986, but many changes were made to power-ups, sound effects, enemy attack patterns, and enemy appearances, making the gameplay considerably different from the arcade version. New additional background music was also included, and it also became possible to rapid-fire shots. Several warps and hidden items were also added, along with an ending screen. The bosses also require multiple hits to destroy them.

Weapons
Weapons can be equipped onto the player's ship by collecting power-ups that corresponds to certain weapons. Weapons come in the form of "wings" that attaches to the ship's sides and each has different abilities. The weapon can be ejected by pressing the secondary button before equipping a new one, and may also be damaged by enemy attack. Damaged weapons will disintegrate and eject automatically.

When the player has no weapon, the ship will simply shoot two small projectiles at the front.

Cannon: Fires 3 projectiles in rapid succession, providing a machine gun effect.
Wide: Fires 5 projectiles that spread wider as they travel across the screen. If one shot hits an enemy, all other shots automatically disappear and are fired again.
Multi: Fires 3 projectiles that changes direction between 4 different angles.
Van: Fires 6 projectiles that travels for an extremely short distance, forming a defensive barrier-like effect.
Side: Fires 7 projectiles, 3 each to the left and right and 1 forward. It is required to destroy certain types of bosses and obstacles
Anti: Fires 4 projectiles, 2 forwards and 2 backwards, allowing it to attack enemies coming from behind.
Ground: Fires 2 projectiles to the ground platform to attack enemies lower than the ship. Only appears in the original arcade version.
Jump: Fires 3 projectiles that is able to jump over any object and explode after traveling a certain distance.
Hammer: Fires 2 projectiles in rapid succession and comes equipped with a pair of rotating projectiles, shielding the ship from enemy attacks. Only available in the Famicom version.
Dyna: Fires a short-range beam that destroys all enemies on its path. Only available in the Famicom version
Fire: Fires a jet of flames capable of penetrating enemies and bosses. Only available in the Famicom version.

Special weapons
In the Famicom version, there are three additional weapons that can only be obtained by destroying certain obstacles;

Staring Silver: Fires green rings that behave similarly to the Dyna, and it has shield mechanism similar to the Hammer.
Aurora Harrier: Fires four energy beams, each to every directions around the ship.
Oct-Blaster: Fires eight projectiles around the ship in all directions.

Items
In the Famicom version, several items are scattered throughout the levels, usually hidden underneath certain obstacle structures or randomly flying around the screen. Certain items disappears when shot, while others will change its effect.

VOL: Allows the player to store spare weapons, which can be used anytime when pausing the game. This can only be used once, unless if one collects more than one VOLs. If shot, it turns into a useless umbrella.
Comet: Teleports the player four levels ahead, skipping any bosses at the cost of extra points. If shot, the item is destroyed.
'"'Floating Wings': A random weapon that floats at certain intervals throughout a level. To obtain it, the attached flying pods must be destroyed to release the weapon.Diamond: A floating diamond with a letter that changes randomly when shot. Each letter corresponds to a specific weapon when picked up.Card Decks: Grants the player an extra life or additional protection for the ship.

 Reception 
In Japan, Game Machine listed B-Wings'' on their November 15, 1984 issue as being the most-successful table arcade unit of the month.

References

External links

1984 video games
Arcade video games
Data East video games
Vertically scrolling shooters
Nintendo Entertainment System games
Video games developed in Japan
Multiplayer and single-player video games
Data East arcade games
Vertically-oriented video games